Catherine Fournier (16 September 1955 – 7 December 2021) was a French politician.

Biography
Fournier began serving as mayor of Fréthun in 1995. She served as General Councilor of the Canton of Calais-Nord-Ouest from 2006 to 2008. She was then elected to the Regional Council of Hauts-de-France in 2016.

On 24 September 2017, Fournier was elected to the Senate. Therefore, she was forced to resign as mayor of Fréthun and was succeeded by Guy Heddebaux. As a senator, she invited yellow vest protestor  to the Senate to discuss the privatization of Groupe ADP and Française des Jeux. However, the meeting was cancelled.

Catherine Fournier died on 7 December 2021, at the age of 66.

References

1955 births
2021 deaths
21st-century French women politicians
People from Boulogne-sur-Mer
Senators of Pas-de-Calais
Women members of the Senate (France)
Union of Democrats and Independents politicians
Mayors of places in Hauts-de-France
Women mayors of places in France